Bijan Sabet is an American venture capitalist who has served as the United States ambassador to the Czech Republic since February 2023.

Education
Sabet's mother immigrated from Korea in the 1960’s, his father immigrated from Iran at the same time. Sabet earned a Bachelor of Science degree from Boston College.

Career
Sabet co-founded Spark Capital in 2005, a venture capital firm that focuses on entrepreneurs and their designs; he currently serves as General Partner. It handles billion of dollars spanning venture and venture growth funds. In his role at Spark Capital, Sabet has led investments and served on the board of directors of early-stage startup companies that have transformed into global leaders Sabet worked as a senior executive in numerous technology startup companies in Silicon Valley, California, and Massachusetts. Sabet helped lead early investments in other companies, such as Wayfair, Cruise Automotive, Oculus, Slack, Tumblr, Warby Parker, Discord, Stack Overflow, etc.

Sabet also serves on the Board of Trustees of Boston College.

United States ambassador to the Czech Republic 
On August 3, 2022, President Joe Biden nominated Sabet to serve as the United States ambassador to the Czech Republic. Hearings on his nomination were held before the Senate Foreign Relations Committee on November 29, 2022. On December 7, 2022, the committee favorably reported his nomination to the Senate. On December 13, 2022, his nomination was confirmed by the Senate by voice vote. He was sworn in on December 16, 2022, and presented his credentials to President Miloš Zeman on February 15, 2023.

See also
Ambassadors of the United States

References

External links

American venture capitalists
Living people
Boston College alumni
Year of birth missing (living people)
Ambassadors of the United States to the Czech Republic
American people of Korean descent
American people of Iranian descent